Crassispira lozoueti is an extinct species of sea snail, a marine gastropod mollusk in the family Pseudomelatomidae, the turrids and allies.

Distribution
Fossils have been found in Oligocene strata in Aquitaine, France.

References

 TuckerJ.K. & Le Renard J, 1993: Liste bibliographique des Turridae (Gastropoda, Conacea) du Paléogène de l'Angleterre, de la Belgique et de la France. Cossmanniana, 2 (1-2) : 1-66
 Lozouet (P.), 2017 Les Conoidea de l’Oligocène supérieur (Chattien) du bassin de l’Adour (Sud-Ouest de la France). Cossmanniana, t. 19, p. 1-179

lozoueti
Gastropods described in 1993